Ian Palmer was a South African footballer. He played in four games for the South Africa national soccer team in 1955, scoring four times.

Career statistics

International

International goals
Scores and results list South Africa's goal tally first.

References

Date of birth unknown
Date of death unknown
South African soccer players
South Africa international soccer players
Association footballers not categorized by position